

The Eberhart XFG was an American single-seat experimental ship-borne biplane fighter aircraft developed for the United States Navy in 1927 by the Eberhart Aeroplane and Motor Company. The sole prototype was rebuilt into the XF2G with the addition of a single float and a different engine, but the aircraft was destroyed in a crash in 1928, and the type did not enter production.

Development
The Eberhart Aeroplane and Motor Company produced its first original plane in 1927—the XFG—as a shipboard fighter for the U.S. Navy. It was of welded steel tube and dural construction with fabric skinning. An unusual feature was the application of sweepback to the upper mainplane and forward sweep to the lower.

Operational history
The sole XFG-1 prototype, bureau number A7944, was tested by the United States Navy in late 1927, and was returned to Eberhart, where it was reconstructed as the XF2G with the addition of a single float and a new  Pratt & Whitney R-1340-D engine. The XF2G-1 prototype was sent back to the Navy for testing at Anacostia in January 1928, but in March 1928, the plane crashed during trials and was destroyed. No further production ensued.

Specifications (XFG)

References

Notes

Citations

Bibliography

 

F1G
Cancelled military aircraft projects of the United States
Eberhart F01G
Single-engined tractor aircraft
Biplanes
Carrier-based aircraft